Chicken foot or chicken feet may refer to:

 Chicken feet, a regional delicacy in many parts of the world
 Chicken foot (game), a domino game of the "Trains" family
 Chickenfoot, an American agro/hard rock 
 Chickenfoot (album), that group's debut album

See also 

 Chicken claw (disambiguation)
 Crow foot (disambiguation)
 Bird's foot (disambiguation)